eNASCAR was launched in 2018, by the parent company, NASCAR, to act as the Esports arm of the auto-racing body. The organization primarily uses the iRacing game via a PC platform for organizing its competitions, but has previously used other systems, such as those created by Xbox and PlayStation, and other games. As of 2022, eNASCAR officially sanctions three leagues.

Current series

eNASCAR Coca-Cola iRacing Series 

The series was founded in 2010, in a partnership with iRacing, with the first race taking place on February 9, 2010. The 2021 champion is Keegan Leahy of 23XI Racing.

The regular season consists of 14 rounds, and one exhibition, that begins in mid-February, at Daytona International Speedway, and ends in August. A total of 40 racers, who race Cup-style cars, compete for ten spots in the playoffs. Points are gained for each race using the current Cup Series format. The ten drivers then qualify for the playoffs with all their points increased to 2,000 plus three bonus points for each win. Each winner of the following three races make the playoffs, as do the highest non-winning drivers until there are four finalists. The winner of the series is determined by which of the four finalists finishes ahead of the other three in the final round.

eNASCAR College iRacing Series 
In 2022, NASCAR and collegiate esports league NACE Starleague joined to form the eNASCAR College iRacing Series. The three-round series allows full-time college students to compete for a chance to win scholarships. The series uses the iRacing platform to host the races with racers using Truck Series chassis. Each round has a two-week time-trial event that takes place a few weeks prior to the race in which the fastest 40 entries make the final race. Only one entry per school is permitted to make the race. As of 2022, the winning driver receives a $3,000 scholarship, second place a $1,000, and third $500.

DBOX eNASCAR International Series 
In June 2021, NASCAR announced a three-race international series that would be hosted on the iRacing platform. The series, which will use Xfinity Series vehicles, will allow non-American racers to compete in a NASCAR-sanctioned eSports series. The inaugural year consisted of a three-course schedule, which grew to five races in 2022. Members of the NASCAR Pinty's Series (Canada), NASCAR Mexico Series, and NASCAR Whelen Euro Series (Europe) are eligible for the series, as are the  members of NASCAR's 2022 Drive for Diversity class.

Former series

eNASCAR iRacing Pro Invitational Series 

While NASCAR was delayed in 2020, due to the COVID-19 pandemic, NASCAR arranged for drivers, both past and present, a series on the iRacing platform. On March 22, 2020, 903,000 people watched the first race at the Homestead–Miami Speedway virtual track, which was an eSports television rating record. This was surpassed a week later when more than 1.3 million people tuned into the virtual race at Texas Motor Speedway.

The series was renewed in 2021, for ten races, and featured never-run courses such as a dirt track at Bristol Motor Speedway and a fictitious Chicago street course. After five races, the series was indefinitely discontinued.

eNASCAR Heat Pro League 
The Heat Pro League ran for two seasons, from 2019 to 2020. The 14-event league featured 28 gamers competing virtually on NASCAR Heat via the PlayStation 4 and Xbox One consoles. The series ended when NASCAR 21: Ignition was released.

References

External links 

 Official website
 iRacing website

Esports leagues
NASCAR video games
Esports competitions in the United States